The history of education in England is documented from Saxon settlement of England, and the setting up of the first cathedral schools in 597 and 604.

Education in England remained closely linked to religious institutions until the nineteenth century, although charity schools and "free grammar schools", which were open to children of any religious beliefs, became more common in the early modern period. Nineteenth century reforms expanded education provision and introduced widespread state-funded schools. By the 1880s education was compulsory for children aged 5 to 10, with the school leaving age progressively raised since then, most recently to 18 in 2015.

The education system was expanded and reorganised multiple times throughout the 20th century, with a Tripartite System introduced in the 1940s, splitting secondary education into grammar schools, secondary technical schools and secondary modern schools. In the 1960s this began to be phased out in favour of comprehensive schools. Further reforms in the 1980s introduced the National Curriculum and allowed parents to choose which school their children went to. Academies were introduced in the 2000s and became the main type of secondary school in the 2010s.

Scotland has a separate system; see History of education in Scotland, much of the information listed below is relevant to Wales but specific information on the development of Education in Wales can be found here.

Medieval period 
Prior to the arrival of Augustine of Canterbury in England in 597 education was an oral affair, or followed the Roman model in diaspora and integrated families.

The earliest known organized schools in England were connected to the church. Augustine established a church in Canterbury (which later became St Augustine's Abbey) in 598, which included a school for the study of religious texts, and in 604 this was joined by another school at what is now Rochester Cathedral. Further schools were established throughout the British Isles in the seventh and eighth centuries, generally following one of two forms: grammar schools to teach Latin, and song schools to train singers for cathedral choirs.

During the Middle Ages, schools were established to teach Latin grammar to the sons of the aristocracy destined for priesthood or monastic work with the ministry of government or the law. Two universities were established in affiliation with the church: the University of Oxford, followed by the University of Cambridge, to assist in the further training of the Catholic Christian clergy. A reformed system of "free grammar schools" was established in the reign of Edward VI; these too provided routes towards priesthood.  Apprenticeship was the main way for youths to enter practical occupations.

Early modern period
Endowed schools have a long history. The oldest, having been founded in 597 as a cathedral school) is King's School, Canterbury. Over time a group of the endowed schools became known as "public schools" to differentiate from private teaching by tutors and to indicate that they were open to the public regardless of religious beliefs, locality and social status. Charity school emerged in the 16th century with the purpose of educating poor children.  Christ's Hospital is the most famous of these schools.

In Tudor England, Edward VI reorganised grammar schools and instituted new ones so that there was a national system of "free grammar schools." In theory these were open to all, offering free tuition to those who could not afford to pay fees. The vast majority of poor children did not attend these schools since their labour was economically critical to their families.

The Protestant Reformation had a major influence on education and literacy in England, as it encouraged the reading of the Bible in English ("the vernacular").

In 1562 the Statute of Artificers and Apprentices was passed to regulate and protect the apprenticeship system, forbidding anyone from practising a trade or craft without first serving a 7-year period as an apprentice to a master. Guilds controlled many trades and used apprenticeships to control entry. (In practice sons of Freemen, members of the guilds, could negotiate shorter terms of training).

Following the Act of Uniformity in 1662, religious dissenters set up academies to educate students of dissenting families, who did not wish to subscribe to the articles of the established Church of England. Some of these 'dissenting academies' still survive, the oldest being Bristol Baptist College. Several Oxford colleges (Harris Manchester, Mansfield, and Regent's Park) are also descendants of this movement.

From 1692, 'parish' apprenticeships under the Elizabethan Poor Law came to be used as a way of providing for poor, illegitimate and orphaned children of both sexes alongside the regular system of skilled apprenticeships, which tended to provide for boys from slightly more affluent backgrounds. These parish apprenticeships, which could be created with the assent of two Justices of the Peace, supplied apprentices for occupations of lower status such as farm labouring, brickmaking and menial household service.

Until as late as the nineteenth century, all university fellows and many schoolmasters were expected or required to be in holy orders.

Schoolmistresses typically taught the three Rs (reading, writing and 'rithmetic) in dame schools, charity schools, or informal village schools.

Historian David Mitch argues that private philanthropy was a major source of funding by the 1640s, and in that regard England was distinctive among modern nations. The endowments were permanent, and were still active in the 19th century.  In addition to the landed elites in gentry, merchants and clergy were generous in supporting educational philanthropy. The national system that was developed in the last two thirds of the 19th century incorporated the earlier endowments.

Eighteenth century
In the early years of the Industrial Revolution entrepreneurs began to resist the restrictions of the apprenticeship system, and a legal ruling established that the Statute of Apprentices did not apply to trades that were not in existence when it was passed in 1563, thus excluding many new 18th century industries.

In the 18th and 19th centuries, the Society for Promoting Christian Knowledge founded many charity schools for poor students in the 7 to 11 age group. These schools were the basis for the development of modern concepts of primary and secondary education. The Society also was an early provider of teacher education.

Sunday School Movement

Robert Raikes initiated the Sunday School Movement, having inherited a publishing business from his father and become proprietor of the Gloucester Journal in 1757. The movement started with a school for boys in the slums.  Raikes had been involved with those incarcerated at the county Poor Law (part of the jail at that time); he believed that "vice" would be better prevented than cured, with schooling as the best intervention.  The best available time was Sunday, as the boys were often working in the factories the other six days. The best available teachers were lay people.  The textbook was the Bible. The original curriculum started with teaching children to read and then having them learn the catechism, reasoning that reading comprehension acquired through Bible study could be transferred to secular studies.

Raikes used his newspaper to publicize the schools and bore most of the cost in the early years.  The movement began in July 1780 in the home of a Mrs. Meredith. Only boys attended, and she heard the lessons of the older boys who coached the younger. Later, girls also attended. Within two years, several schools opened in and around Gloucester.  Raikes published an account on 3 November 1783 of Sunday School in his paper, and later word of the work spread through the Gentleman's Magazine, and in 1784, a letter to the Arminian Magazine.

The original schedule for the schools, as written by Raikes was "The children were to come after ten in the morning, and stay till twelve; they were then to go home and return at one; and after reading a lesson, they were to be conducted to Church.  After Church, they were to be employed in repeating the catechism till after five, and then dismissed, with an injunction to go home without making a noise."

Nineteenth century

In the 19th century the Church of England sponsored most formal education until the government established  free, compulsory education towards the end of that century. University College London was established as the first secular college in England, open to students of all religions (or none), followed by King's College London; the two institutions formed the University of London. Durham University was also established in the early nineteenth century. Towards the end of the century, the "redbrick" universities, new public universities, were founded.

Since the establishment of Lady Margaret Hall (Oxford) Bedford College (London), Girton College (Cambridge) and Somerville College (Oxford) in the 19th century, women also can obtain a university degree.

National schools and British Schools
Prior to the nineteenth century, most schools were run by church authorities and stressed religious education.  The Church of England resisted early attempts for the state to provide secular education.  In 1811, the Anglican National Society for Promoting the Education of the Poor in the Principles of the Established Church in England and Wales was established.  The schools founded by the National Society were called National Schools. Most of the surviving schools were eventually absorbed into the state system under the Butler Act (1944), and to this day many state schools, most of them primary schools, maintain a link to the Church of England, reflecting their historic origins. The Protestant non-conformist, non-denominational, or "British schools" were founded by  Society for Promoting the Lancasterian System for the Education of the Poor, an organisation formed in 1808 by Joseph Fox, William Allen and Samuel Whitbread and supported by several evangelical and non-conformist Christians.

In 1814, compulsory apprenticeship by indenture was abolished.  By 1831, Sunday School in Great Britain was ministering weekly to 1,250,000 children, approximately 25% of the population.  As these schools preceded the first state funding of schools for the common public, they are sometimes seen as a forerunner to the current English school system.

Ragged schools

In 1818, John Pounds, known as the crippled cobbler, set up a school and began teaching poor children reading, writing, and arithmetic without charging fees.

In 1820, Samuel Wilderspin opened the first infant school in Spitalfields.

After John Pounds' death in 1839 Thomas Guthrie wrote Plea for Ragged Schools and started a ragged school in Edinburgh, another one was started in Aberdeen. In 1844 Anthony Ashley-Cooper, 7th Earl of Shaftesbury formed the 'Ragged School Union' dedicated to the free education of destitute children and over the next eight years over 200 free schools for poor children were established in Britain. with some 300,000 children passing through the London Ragged Schools alone between 1844 and 1881.

Government involvements
In August 1833, Parliament voted sums of money each year for the construction of schools for poor children, the first time the state had become involved with education in England and Wales  (whereas a programs for universal education in Scotland had been initiated in the seventeenth century). A meeting in Manchester in 1837, chaired by Mark Philips, led to the creation of the Lancashire Public Schools' Association. The association proposed that non-denominational schools should be funded from local taxes.
Also  1837, the Whig former Lord Chancellor Henry Brougham presented a bill for public education.

In 1839 government grants for the construction and maintenance of schools were switched to voluntary bodies, and became conditional on a satisfactory inspection.

In 1840 the Grammar Schools Act expanded the Grammar School curriculum from classical studies to include science and literature.  In 1861 the Royal Commission on the state of popular education in England, chaired by the Duke of Newcastle, reported "The number of children whose names ought [in summer 1858 in England and Wales] to have been on the school books, in order that all might receive some education, was 2,655,767.  The number we found to be actually on the books was 2,535,462, thus leaving 120,305 children without any school instruction whatever."

In fee-charging public schools, which served the upper-class, important reforms were initiated by Thomas Arnold in Rugby. They redefined standards of masculinity, putting a heavy emphasis on sports and teamwork.

Robert Lowe (1811-1892), a powerful Liberal politician who worked closely with Prime Minister Gladstone, was a key reformer.  He agreed with the consensus against too much centralization in English education, but wanted to improve educational standards,  and prevent the waste of public money on inefficient teaching, especially in church schools.  He introduced a revised code in 1861; future grants would be allocated not by the subjective judgment of inspectors but rather on the basis of the number of students passing an examination in reading, writing, and arithmetic. It was known as ‘payment by results’.  The code ended the favouritism often shown by inspectors; it came under attack by schoolteachers, inspectors, and Anglican and dissenting opponents of state activity.

The Elementary Education Act of 1870

Out of 4.3 million children of primary school age in England & Wales, 1 million were in purely voluntary schools and 1.3 million were in state aided schools, but 2 million had no access to schools whatsoever.

William Forster's Elementary Education Act 1870 required partially state-funded board schools to be set up to provide elementary (primary, in modern parlance) education in areas where existing provision was inadequate. Board schools were managed by elected school boards. The schools remained fee-charging, but poor parents could be exempted. The previous government grant scheme established in 1833 ended on 31 December 1870.

Section 74 of the Act empowered school boards to, if they wished, make local byelaws making attendance compulsory between the ages of 5 and 13 but exempting any child aged over 10 who had reached the expected standard (which varied by board). Other exceptions included illness, if children worked, or lived too far from a school.

Two measures in the Act became, for religious reasons, matters of controversy within the governing Liberal Party. Firstly, nonconformists objected to their children being taught Anglican doctrine. As a compromise, William Cowper-Temple (pronounced "Cooper-Temple"), a Liberal MP, proposed that religious teaching in the new state schools be non-denominational, in practice restricted to learning the Bible and a few hymns: this became the famous Cowper-Temple clause (Section 14 of the Act). Section 7 also gave parents the right to withdraw their children from any religious instruction provided in board schools, and to withdraw their children to attend any other religious instruction of their choice.

Secondly, Section 25 gave school boards the power to, if they chose, pay the fees of poor children attending voluntary (i.e. church) schools. Although few school boards actually did so, the provision caused great anger among nonconformists, who saw this as local ratepayers’ money being spent on Church of England schools. A large conference was held at Manchester in 1872 to lead resistance to the section, and one of the campaigners was the Birmingham politician Joseph Chamberlain, who emerged as a national figure for the first time. The resulting splits (some education campaigners, including Chamberlain, stood for Parliament as independent candidates) helped to cost the Liberals the 1874 election.

Compulsory and free primary education: 1880s and 1890s
The "Sandon Act" (Act of 1876) imposed a legal duty on parents to ensure that their children were educated. The Elementary Education Act 1880 (the "Mundella Act") required school boards to enforce compulsory attendance from 5 to 10 years, and permitted them to set a standard which children were required to reach before they could be employed. Poorer families were often tempted to send their children to work if the opportunity to earn an extra income was available.  Attendance officers often visited the homes of children who failed to attend school, which often proved to be ineffective.  Children who were employed were required to have a certificate to show they had reached the educational standard.  Employers of these children who were unable to show this were penalised.

The  Elementary Education Act 1891 provided for the state payment of school fees up to ten shillings per head, making primary education effectively free.

The  Elementary Education (School Attendance) Act 1893 raised the school leaving age to 11.  The Elementary Education (Blind and Deaf Children) Act of the same year extended compulsory education to blind and deaf children, and made provision for the creation of special schools.

The Voluntary Schools Act 1897  provided grants to public elementary schools not funded by school boards (typically Church schools).

Another act in 1899 raised the school leaving age to 12.

In the late Victorian period grammar schools were reorganised and their curriculum was modernised. Latin was still taught.

Funding of technical colleges
The Technical Instruction Act 1889 was passed. According to D. Evans, "It gave powers to the County Councils and the Urban Sanitary Authorities to levy a penny tax to support technical and manual instruction.  The curricula in technical institutions also had to be approved by the Science and Art Department.  In the following year the Local Taxation Act introduced the 'whiskey tax', which made extra money available for technical instruction."

From April 1900 higher elementary schools were recognised, providing education from the age of 10 to 15.

Balfour and Local Education Authorities

Balfour Act of 1902

The controversial Conservative Education Act 1902 (or 'Balfour Act') made radical changes to the entire educational system of England and Wales. It weakened the divide between schools run by the 2,568 school boards and the 14,000 church schools, administered primarily by the Church of England, which educated about a third of children. Local Education Authorities were established, which were able to set local tax rates, and the school boards were disbanded. Funds were provided for denominational religious instruction in voluntary elementary schools, owned primarily by the Church of England and Roman Catholics. The law was extended in 1903 to cover London.

G. R. Searle, like nearly all historians, argues the Act was a short-term political disaster for the Conservative Party because it outraged Methodists, Baptists and other nonconformists. It subsidised the religions they rejected. However Searle argues it was a long-term success. The Church schools now had some financing from local ratepayers and had to meet uniform standards. It led to a rapid growth of secondary schools, with over 1000 opening by 1914, including 349 for girls. Eventually (in 1944), the Anglican schools were effectively nationalised. Grammar schools also became funded by the LEA. The act was of particular significance as it allowed for all schools, including denominational schools, to be funded through rates (local taxation), and ended the role of locally elected school boards that often attracted women, non-conformists and labour union men. The Liberals came to power in 1906, but their attempt to repeal the act was blocked by the House of Lords, setting up a major constitutional confrontation.

In the long run the Nonconformist schools practically vanished. In 1902 the Methodists operated 738 schools, but these rapidly declined throughout the 20th century. Only 28 remained in 1996.

The Fisher Act of 1918
The Fisher Education Act 1918 made secondary education compulsory up to age 14 and gave responsibility for secondary schools to the state.  Under the Act, many higher elementary schools and endowed grammar schools sought to become state funded central schools or secondary schools. However, most children attended elementary (primary, in modern parlance) school until age 14, rather than going to a separate school for secondary education.

The act was also known as the "Fisher Act" as it was devised by H. A. L. Fisher. The act enforced compulsory education from 5–14 years, but also included provision for compulsory part-time education for all 14- to 18-year-olds. There were also plans for expansion in tertiary education, by raising the participation age to 18. This was dropped because of the cuts in public spending after World War I. This is the first act which starting planning provisions for young people to remain in education until the age of 18. The 1918 act was not immediately implemented, instead waiting until an act in 1921 before coming into effect.

After the passing of the Local Government Act 1929, Poor Law schools became state funded elementary schools. The concept of junior technical schools was introduced in the 1930s to provide vocational education at secondary level, but few were ever opened.

Spens and Norwood reports
In 1937 historian G.A.N. Lowndes identified a "Silent Social Revolution" in England and Wales since 1895 that could be credited to the expansion of public education:
The contribution which a sound and universal system of public education can make to the sobriety, orderliness and stability of a population is perhaps the most patent of its benefits. What other gains can be placed to its credit?...Can it be claimed that the widening of educational opportunity in the long run repays that cost to the community by a commensurate increase in the national wealth and prosperity? Or can it be claimed that it is making the population happier, better able to utilise its leisure, more adaptable? Anyone who knows how the schools have come to life in the past decade, anyone who is in a position to take a wide view of the social condition of the people and compare conditions to-day with those forty years ago, will have no hesitation in answering these questions in the affirmative.

A report of 1938 of a committee chaired by Will Spens, a former Vice-Chancellor of the University of Cambridge, recommended that entry to schools would be based on intelligence testing. This was followed by the Norwood Report of 1943 which advocated the "Tripartite System" of secondary education which was introduced in the late 1940s.

1944: Butler

The Education Act 1944 was an answer to surging social and educational demands created by the war and the widespread demands for social reform. The Education Act 1944, relating to England and Wales, was authored by Conservative Rab Butler and known as "the Butler Act", defined the modern split between primary education and secondary education at age 11.

The Butler Act was also an historic compromise between church and state. Three new categories of schools were created. The first were Voluntary Controlled schools whose costs were met by the State, and would be controlled by the local education authority. The school kept the title deeds to the land, but taught an agreed religious education syllabus. These schools were favoured by the Anglicans: over half their schools chose this status, and were soon effectively absorbed into the state system. The second were Voluntary Aided schools, which retained greater influence over school admission policies, staffing and curriculum, and which were preferred by the Roman Catholics and by some Anglican schools. They would have all of their running costs met by the State, but their capital costs would only be 50% state funded (later increased to 75% by the Education Act 1959, and now 90%). The third were Direct Grant Schools: former independent schools, often town grammar schools and predominantly in the north of England, who accepted a state grant in return for providing free education to many students but still charging for others. The state had little control on syllabus or admissions policy. The schools kept their title deeds.

The elite system of public schools was practically unchanged; Butler assembled a committee which produced the Fleming Report of July 1944, recommending that places at public schools be made available to state-funded scholarships, but its recommendations were not implemented.

The school leaving age was raised to 15 under the Butler Act, with an aspiration to raise it in time to 16, although this did not take place until the early 1970s (see below). The Act also recommended compulsory part-time education for all young people until the age of 18, but this provision was dropped so as not to overburden the post-war spending budget (as had happened similarly with the Act of 1918).

Changes in government approaches towards education meant that it was no longer regarded adequate for a child to leave education aged 14, as that is the age when they were seen to really understand and appreciate the value of education, as well as being the period when adolescence was at its height. It was beginning to be seen as the worst age for a sudden switch from education to employment, with the additional year in schooling to only provide benefits for the children when they leave. Although there were concerns about the effects of having less labour from these children, it was hoped that the outcome of a larger quantity of more qualified, skilled workers would eliminate the deficit problem from the loss of unskilled labour.

The 1944 Act took effect in 1947 when the Labour Party was in power and it adopted the Tripartite System, consisting of grammar schools, secondary modern schools and secondary technical schools. It rejected the comprehensive school proposals favoured by a few in the Labour Party as more equalitarian.   Under the tripartite model, students who passed an exam were able to attend a prestigious grammar school. Those who did not pass the selection test attended secondary modern schools or technical schools.

The new law was widely praised by Conservatives because it honoured religion and social hierarchy, by Labour because it opened new opportunities for the working class, and by the general public because it ended the fees they had to pay.  The act became a permanent part of the Post-war consensus supported by the three major parties.

However, selection of academical gifted children to attend grammar school became increasingly controversial in the 1960s.  Critics on the left attacked grammar schools as elitist because a student had to pass a test at age 11 to get in. Defenders argued that grammar schools allow pupils to obtain a good education through merit rather than through family income.  No changes were made. In some areas, notably that of the London County Council, comprehensive schools had been introduced. They had no entrance test and were open to all children living in the school catchment area. However, despite tentative support for 'multilateralism' in secondaries, and a desire to raise the standard of secondary moderns to that of private institutions, from Minister for Education Ellen Wilkinson, the majority of Labour MPs were more concerned with implementing the 1944 Act; her successor George Tomlinson saw this through, although the secondary technicals remained underdeveloped.

Circular 10/65 and comprehensive education

In 1965 the Labour government required all local education authorities to formulate proposals to move away from selection at eleven, replacing the tripartite system with comprehensive schools. This was done by the minister Tony Crosland by means of Circular 10/65 and withholding funding from any school that sought to retain selection. This circular was vehemently opposed by the grammar school lobby. Some counties procrastinated and retained the Tripartite System in all but a few experimental areas. Those authorities have locally administered selection tests.

The Circular also requested consultation between LEAs and the partially state-funded direct grant grammar schools on their participation in a comprehensive system, but little movement occurred.  The 1970 report of the Public Schools Commission chaired by David Donnison recommended that the schools choose between becoming voluntary aided comprehensives and full independence.  This was finally put into effect by the Direct Grant Grammar Schools (Cessation of Grant) Regulations 1975.  Some schools (almost all Catholic) became fully state-funded, while the majority became independent fee-paying schools.

In 1973 the introduction of the Education (Work Experience) Act allowed LEAs to organise work experience for the additional final year school students.

In some counties around the country, these changes also led to the introduction of Middle schools in 1968, where students were kept at primary or junior school for an additional year, meaning that the number of students in secondary schools within these areas remained virtually constant through the change. , there are now fewer than 400 middle schools across England, situated in just 22 Local Education Authorities.

Raising of school leaving age (ROSLA)

In 1964, preparations had begun to raise the school leaving age to 16 to be enforced from 1 September 1973 onwards. This increased the legal leaving age from 15 to 16 and for one year, 1973, there were no 15-year-old school leavers as the students, by law, had to complete an additional year of education.

Many secondary schools were unable to accommodate the new 5th year students. The solution to the problem was to construct new buildings (often referred to as "ROSLA Buildings" or "ROSLA Blocks") for the schools  that needed to extend their capacity. This provided the space to cope with the new cohort of ROSLA students. The ROSLA Buildings were delivered to schools in self assembly packs and were not intended to stand long-term, though some have proven to have stood much longer than was initially planned and were still in use in the 2010s.

Primary schools
The 1967 Plowden Report advocated a more child-centred approach to primary education, and also supported the introduction of middle schools. While many of the report's recommendations were never implemented, primary schools began to move away from rote learning in the late 1960s and 1970s.

Apprenticeships
High technology industry (Aerospace, Nuclear, Oil & Gas, Automotive, Power Generation and Distribution etc.) trained its professional engineers via the advanced apprenticeship system of learning – usually a 5-year process. The higher Apprenticeship framework in the 1950s, 60s and 70s was designed to allow young people (16 years) an alternative path to A Levels to achieve an academic qualification at level 4 or 5 NVQ (National Vocational Qualification).   The Higher Apprenticeship Framework was open to young people who had a minimum of 4 GCE "O" Levels to enrol in an Ordinary National Certificate or Diploma or a City & Guilds technician course.  For advanced engineering apprenticeships "O" Levels had to include Mathematics, Physics, and English language. The advanced apprenticeship framework's purpose was to provide a supply of young people seeking to enter work-based learning via apprenticeships by offering structured high value learning and transferable skills and knowledge. These apprenticeships were enabled by linking industry with local technical colleges and professional Engineering Institutions.

The Advanced Apprenticeship Framework offered clear pathways and outcomes that addressed the issues facing the industry.  This system was in place since the 1950s.  The system provided young people with an alternative to staying in full-time education beyond 16/18 to gain pure academic qualifications without work-based learning.  The Advanced Apprenticeships of the 1950s, 60s and 70s provided the necessary preparation towards Engineering Technician, Technician Engineer or Chartered Engineer registration. Apprentices undertook a variety of job roles in numerous technical functions to assist the work of engineers, in the design, development, manufacture and maintenance of production system.

Industry Training Boards (ITBs) were introduced by the Industrial Training Act (1964 and amended 1982), requiring employers in a number of sectors to pay a training levy to their industry training board or apply a similar sum to the provision of training to their employees.  Later phased out, the Construction Industry Training Board survives (as of 2018).

In modern times, apprenticeship became less important, especially as employment in heavy industry and artisan trades has declined since the 1980s. Traditional apprenticeships reached their lowest point in the 1980s: by that time, training programmes were rare and people who were apprentices learned mainly by example.

Conservative governments, from 1979 to 1997
Following the 1979 General Election, the Conservative Party regained power under Margaret Thatcher. In the early period it made two main changes:

 New Vocationalism was expanded (Labour had made some small efforts beforehand, but the Conservatives expanded it considerably).  This was seen as an effort to reduce the high youth unemployment, which was regarded as one of the causes of the sporadic rioting at the end of the seventies. The Youth Opportunities Programme was the main scheme, offered to 16- to 18-year-olds. It had been introduced in 1978 under the Labour government of James Callaghan, was expanded in 1980 under the Conservative government of Margaret Thatcher, and ran until 1983 when it was replaced by the Youth Training Scheme.
 The Assisted Places Scheme was introduced in 1980, whereby gifted children who could not afford to go to fee-paying schools would be given free places in those schools if they could pass the school's entrance exam.

In 1986, National Vocational Qualifications (NVQs) were introduced, in an attempt to revitalise vocational training. Still, by 1990, apprenticeship took up only two-thirds of one percent of total employment.

The Education Reform Act of 1988
The 1988 Education Reform Act made considerable changes to the education system.  These changes were aimed at creating a 'market' in education with schools competing with each other for 'customers' (pupils). The theory was that "bad" schools would lose pupils to the "good" schools and either have to improve, reduce in capacity or close.

The reforms included the following:

 The National Curriculum was introduced, which made it compulsory for schools to teach certain subjects and syllabuses. Previously the choice of subjects had been up to the school.
 National curriculum assessments were introduced at the Key Stages 1 to 4 (ages 7, 11, 14 and 16 respectively) through what were formerly called Standard Assessment Tests (SATS). At Key Stage 4 (age 16), the assessments were made from the GCSE exam.
 Formula funding was introduced, which meant that the more children a school could attract to it, the more money the school would receive.
 Open enrolment and choice for parents was brought back, so that parents could choose or influence which school their children went to.
 Schools could, if enough of their pupils' parents agreed, opt out of local government control, becoming grant maintained schools and receiving funding direct from central government. The government offered more money than the school would get usually from the local authority as an enticement. This was seen as a politically motivated move since the Conservative central government was taking control from local authorities which were often run by other parties.
 Religious education was reformed; Chapter 1 of the law required that the majority of collective worship be "wholly or mainly of a broadly Christian character".

Apprenticeship reform
In 1994, the government introduced Modern Apprenticeships (since renamed 'Apprenticeships'), based on frameworks devised by Sector Skills Councils.  These frameworks contain a number of separately certified elements:
a knowledge-based element, typically certified through a qualification known as a 'Technical Certificate';
a competence-based element, typically certified through an NVQ; and
Key Skills (literacy and numeracy).

Education Act 1996
Between 1976 and 1997, the minimum school leaving arrangements were:
 A child whose sixteenth birthday falls in the period 1 September to 31 January inclusive, may leave compulsory schooling at the end of the Spring term (the following Easter).
 A child whose sixteenth birthday falls in the period 1 February to 31 August, may leave on the Friday before the last Monday in May.

Under section 8(4) of the Education Act 1996, a new single school leaving date was set for 1998 and all subsequent years thereafter. This was set as the last Friday in June in the school year which the child reaches the age of 16.

Under section 7 of the Act, it was made an obligation for parents to ensure a full-time education for their children either at school or "otherwise" which formalised the status of home education.

Labour, from 1997 to 2010
New Labour adopted an "Education, Education, Education" slogan in the mid-1990s, but maintained many of the Conservative changes after returning to power after the 1997 general election. The following changes did take place, however:

 The previous Labour focus on the comprehensive system was shifted to a focus on tailoring education to each child's ability.  Critics see this as reminiscent of the original intentions of the Tripartite system.
 Grant-maintained status was abolished, with GM schools being given the choice of rejoining the local authority as a maintained community school, or becoming a foundation school.

Although the Government-run eleven-plus exam selection exam for all children had now been abolished, voluntary selection tests continue in certain areas, where some of the original grammar schools have been retained.  These areas include: Northern Ireland and some English counties and districts including Devon, Dorset, Kent, Buckinghamshire, Essex, Birmingham, Trafford, Wiltshire, North Yorkshire, Calderdale, Kirklees, Wirral, Warwickshire, Gloucestershire, Lincolnshire and some London boroughs such as Bexley, Kingston-upon-Thames and Redbridge.  There have been various (so far unsuccessful) attempts by campaigners to abolish all remaining grammar schools.  The remaining grammar schools are now thus still selective, typically taking the top 10-25% of those from the local catchment area.  Some of the still-existing grammar schools in the United Kingdom can trace their history back to earlier than the sixteenth century.

 Labour expanded a policy started by the Conservatives of creating specialist schools via the specialist schools programme. This new type of secondary school teaches the National Curriculum subjects plus a few specialist branches of knowledge (e.g. business studies) not found in most other schools.  These schools are allowed to select 10% of their pupils.
 Numbers: In 1997 there were 196 of these schools. In August 2002 there were 1000. By 2006 the plan was to have 2000, and the goal was to make all secondary schools specialist eventually.
 The Beacon Schools programme was established in England in 1998. Its aim was to identify high performing schools, in order to help them form partnerships with each other and to provide examples of effective practice for other schools. The programme was replaced in August 2005 with more broadly based programmes; the Leading Edge Partnership programme (for secondary schools) and Primary Strategy Learning Networks (PSLNs) (at the primary level).
 A new grade of Advanced Skills Teacher was created, with the intention that highly skilled teachers would be paid more if they accepted new posts with outreach duties beyond their own schools.
 City Academies were introduced. These are new schools, built on the site of, or taking over from existing failing schools. A city academy is an independent school within the state system. It is outside the control of the local education authority and set up with substantial funding from interested third parties, which might be businesses, charities or private individuals.
 Education Action Zones were introduced, which are deprived areas run by an action forum of people within that area with the intention of making that area's schools better.
 Vocational qualifications were renamed/restructured as follows:
 GNVQs became Vocational GCSEs and AVCEs.
 NVQs scope expanded so that a degree-equivalent NVQ was possible.
 The New Deal was introduced, which made advisors available to long-term unemployed (in the UK this is defined as being unemployed for more than 6 months) to give help and money to those who want to go back into Education.
 Introduced Literacy and Numeracy Hours into schools, and set targets for literacy and numeracy.
 Set Truancy targets.
 Set a maximum class size of 30 for 5-7 year olds.
 Introduced the EMA, (Education Maintenance Allowance), which is paid to those between 16 and 18 as an enticement to remain in full-time education and get A-Levels/AVCEs.
 A Performance Threshold was introduced in 2000 to allow experienced teachers access to  higher rates of pay on meeting a set of performance standards, including a standard of pupil attainment. The performance-related pay changes have been bitterly opposed by teaching unions, most notably the National Union of Teachers which challenged the Threshold scheme by legal action.
 Introduced Curriculum 2000, which reformed the Further Education system into the current structure of AS levels, A2 levels and Key Skills.
 Abolished the Assisted Places Scheme.
 A report was commissioned, led by the former chief-inspector of schools, Mike Tomlinson, into reform of the curriculum and qualifications structure for 14- to 19-year-olds.  The report was published on 18 October 2004 and recommended the introduction of a diploma that would bring together both vocational and academic qualifications and ensure that all pupils had a basic set of core skills.  It is proposed that the current qualifications would evolve into this diploma over the next decade, whether the government will follow the recommendations is yet to be seen — the Conservative Party have already introduced alternative proposals to return to norm-referencing in A-levels rather than the current system of criterion-referencing.
 In 2003 a green paper entitled Every Child Matters was published. It built on existing plans to strengthen children's services and focused on four key areas:
 Increasing the focus on supporting families and carers as the most critical influence on children's lives
 Ensuring necessary intervention takes place before children reach crisis point and protecting children from falling through the net
 Addressing the underlying problems identified in the report into the death of Victoria Climbié – weak accountability and poor integration
 Ensuring that the people working with children are valued, rewarded and trained

 The green paper prompted a debate about services for children, young people and families resulting in a consultation with those working in children's services, and with parents, children and young people. The Government published Every Child Matters: the Next Steps in November 2004, and passed the Children Act 2004, providing the legislative spine for developing more effective and accessible services focused around the needs of children, young people and families.

 In January 2007 Education Secretary Alan Johnson announced plans to extend the school leaving age in England to eighteen by 2013. This would raise the leaving age for the first time since 1972, when compulsory education was extended to sixteen. The changes included apprenticeships and work based training in addition to continued academic learning. This became law through the Education and Skills Act 2008, with the school leaving age raised to 17 in 2013 and 18 in 2015.

Cameron premiership 2010 – 2016

The Academies Act 2010, one of the first government bills introduced in the Conservative – Liberal Democrat coalition government, allowed publicly funded schools in England to become academies, still publicly funded but with a vastly increased degree of autonomy in issues such as setting teachers' wages and diverging from the National Curriculum. This also led to various mergers between schools into much larger Academies.

The Education Act 2011 made changes to many areas of educational policy, including the power of school staff to discipline students, the manner in which newly trained teachers are supervised, the regulation of qualifications, the administration of local authority maintained schools, academies, the provision of post-16 education, including vocational apprenticeships, and student finance for higher education. It abolished the General Teaching Council for England, the Qualifications and Curriculum Development Agency and the Training and Development Agency for Schools and other  bodies.

In 2013 the Education and Skills Act 2008 came into force, requiring all young people in England to stay on in education or training at least part-time until they are 17 years old, with this extended to 18 years in 2015.

Academic qualifications
Alongside vocational qualifications such as GNVQs and BTECs, there have been numerous examinations and qualifications in secondary education in England.

See also
Public school (United Kingdom)
List of the oldest schools in the United Kingdom
Armorial of UK schools

References

Further reading
 Aldrich, Richard, Dennis Dean, and Peter Gordon. Education and policy in England in the twentieth century (1991). excerpt
 Barker, R. Education and Politics 1900-1951 (1972). online
 Barnard, H.C. A History of English Education (1961) online.
 Best, G. F. A. "The Religious Difficulties of National Education in England, 1800-70." Cambridge Historical Journal 12#2 (1956): 155–73. online.
 Birchenough, Charles. History of Elementary Education in England and Wales from 1800 to the Present Day (1920) online free
 
 Dent, H.C. 1870-1970 Century of Growth in English Education (1970).
 Foght, H.W. ed. Comparative education (1918), compares United States, England, Germany, France, Canada, and Denmark online
 Freeman, Mark. "Adult education history in Britain: past, present and future (part I)." Paedagogica Historica 56.3 (2020): 384–395; "Adult education history in Britain: past, present, and future (part II)." Paedagogica Historica 56.3 (2020): 396–411.

 

 Jarman, T.L.  Landmarks in the History Of Education (1951) 325pp; scholarly history online
 Johnson, Marion. Derbyshire Village Schools in the Nineteenth Century (1970).
 Kelly, Thomas. History of Adult Education in Great Britain from the Middle Ages to the Twentieth Century (2nd ed. 1970).
 Knight, C. The Making of Tory Education Policy in Post-War Britain 1950-1986 (1990).
 
 Lawton, Denis. Education and Labour Party Ideologies, 1900-2001 and Beyond (2004) online
 Lowe, R. Education in the Post-War Years: A Social History (1988).
 Lowndes, G.A.N. The Silent Social Revolution: An Account of Public Education in England and Wales, 1895–1935 (Oxford University Press, 1937) online
 Mitch, David. "Schooling for all via financing by some: perspectives from early modern and Victorian England." Paedagogica Historica 52.4 (2016): 325–348.
 
 Mulder, John R. The temple of the mind; education and literary taste in seventeenth century England (1969) online free to borrow
 O'Day, Rosemary. Education and Society, 1500-1800: The Social Foundations of Education in Early Modern Britain (1982)
 Richmond, W.K.R. History of Education: Education in Britain Since 1944 (2007).
 Royle, Edward. Modern Britain: A Social History 1750-2010 (1987, 1997, 3rd ed, 2012)  part 7; a 55-page summary
 Rubinstein, D. and Simon, B. The Evolution of the Comprehensive School 1926-1972 (1969) online
 Sanderson, Michael. Education, economic change and society in England 1780-1870 (Cambridge UP, 1995).
 Sanderson, Michael. Education and Economic Decline in Britain, 1870 to the 1990s (New Studies in Economic and Social History) (1999)
 Simon, Brian. The two nations and the educational structure, 1780-1870 (1960) a Marxist scholarly history in 4 volumes
 Simon, Brian. Education and the Labour Movement, 1870-1920 (1965)
 Simon, Brian. The Politics of Educational Reform 1920-1940 (1974).
 Simon, Brian. Education and the Social Order 1940-1990  (1991). 
 Stephens, W. B. Education in Britain 1750-1914 (1999)
 Stone, Lawrence. "Literacy and education in England 1640-1900." Past & Present 42 (1969): 69-139 online.
 Sturt, Mary. The education of the people: A history of primary education in England and Wales in the nineteenth century (1967)
 Wardle, David. English popular education 1780-1970 (Cambridge UP, 1970) online
 Watson Foster, ed. The Encyclopaedia and Dictionary of Education (London: 1921, 4 vol) online free 
 Woodward, Llewellyn. The Age of Reform 1815–1870 (2nd edn., 1962)  pp 474–501. [https://archive.org/details/ageofreform181510000wood online[
 Wrigley Terry. The politics of curriculum in school (London: Centre for Labour and Social Studies, 2014). online

Historiography
 Bischof, Christopher. "Progress and the people: histories of mass education and conceptions of Britishness, 1870–1914." History of Education 49.2 (2020): 160–183.
 Jones, Ken. "The past is all before us: the history of education in hard times." British Journal of Sociology of Education 33.6 (2012): 935–949.
 McCulloch, Gary, ed. The RoutledgeFalmer Reader in History of Education (2005) recent scholarly articles. excerpt
 McCulloch, Gary. Historical Research in Educational Settings (2000); textbook on how to write British educational history.   excerpt; Good bibliography
 McCulloch, Gary. "A people’s history of education: Brian Simon, the British Communist Party and Studies in the History of Education, 1780–1870." History of education 39.4 (2010): 437–457.
 McCulloch, Gary. The Struggle for the History of Education (2011), Focus on Britain  excerpt; Chapter 1 covers historiography.
 McCulloch, Gary. "The Standing Conference on Studies in Education–sixty years on." British journal of educational studies 60.4 (2012): 301–316.
 Martin, Mary Clare. "Church, school and locality: Revisiting the historiography of 'state' and 'religious' educational infrastructures in England and Wales, 1780–1870." Paedagogica Historica 49.1 (2013): 70–81.
 Richardson, William. "British historiography of education in international context at the turn of the century, 1996–2006." History of education 36.4-5 (2007): 569–593.
 Sanderson, Michael. "Educational and economic history: the good neighbours." History of Education 36.4-5 (2007): 429–445.
 Whitehead, Clive. "The historiography of British imperial education policy, Part I: India." History of Education 34.3 (2005): 315–329.
 Whitehead, Clive. "The historiography of British Imperial education policy, Part II: Africa and the rest of the colonial empire." History of Education 34.4 (2005): 441–454.

Women
 Adams, Pauline. Somerville for Women: an Oxford College 1879–1993 (1996)
 Dyhouse, Carol. No Distinction Of Sex?: Women In British Universities, 1870-1939 (1995)
 Eschbach, Elizabeth Seymour. The higher education of women in England and America, 1865-1920  (1993)
 Gomersall, Meg. "Education for Domesticity? A nineteenth‐century perspective on girls' schooling and education." Gender and Education 6#3 (1994): 235–247.
 Kamm, Josephine. Hope Deferred: Girls' Education in English History (1965) .
 Purvis, June. A history of women's education in England (Open University, 1991).
 Raftery, Deirdre. "The Opening of Higher Education to Women in Nineteenth Century England: 'Unexpected Revolution' or Inevitable Change?." Higher Education Quarterly 56.4 (2002): 331–346.
 Rowold, Katharina. The educated woman: minds, bodies, and women's higher education in Britain, Germany, and Spain, 1865-1914 (Routledge, 2011).
 Schwartz, Laura. "Feminist thinking on education in Victorian England." Oxford Review of Education 37#5 (2011): 669–682.
 Tamboukou, Maria. "Of other spaces: Women's colleges at the turn of the nineteenth century in the UK." Gender, Place and Culture: A Journal of Feminist Geography 7#3 (2000): 247–263.
 Trouvé‐Finding, Susan. "Teaching as a woman’s job: the impact of the admission of women to elementary teaching in England and France in the late nineteenth and early twentieth centuries." History of Education 34#5 (2005): 483–496.

Primary sources
 Leachpoopoo, Arthur F. ed. Educational Charters and Documents 598 to 1909 (1911) 640pp; online;  excerpts from Google; few items after 1600
 Mothersole, Hartley B. N. Everybody's guide to the Education act, 1902, being the text of the act, together with an introduction and explanatory notes (1903) Online free

External links
Brief history of British education emphasizing relevant Acts of Parliament
Derek Gillard,  Education in England: The History of Our Schools (2018) an online free textbook
 600 historic education documents selected by Derek Gillard
 full or partial text of major books, selected by Derek Gillard

 
Education finance in the United Kingdom